Warren Amerine Stephens (born February 18, 1957) is an American businessman.  He is the chairman, president and chief executive officer (CEO) of Stephens Inc., a privately held investment bank. Stephens lives in Little Rock, Arkansas.

Early life and education
Stephens was born in Little Rock, the son of Jackson T. Stephens and Mary Amerine Stephens. Warren's father, "Jack" Stephens, and his uncle, "Witt" Stephens, partnered as investors and financiers in the investment firm, Stephens Inc.

Warren began his education in Little Rock, and in 1975, graduated from Trinity Presbyterian High School in Montgomery, Alabama.  He graduated from Washington and Lee University in 1979 with a BA in Economics, and received his MBA from Wake Forest University in 1981.

Career
Stephens joined his father and uncle in the investment banking business in Little Rock, which had 139 employees.  At that time, the firm resembled and operated much like one of the old British merchant banks, investing the firm's and family funds in various businesses and ventures, and it still operates the same way today. Stephens Inc is noted for handling the IPO of Wal-Mart Stores in 1970.

Stephens began work as an associate in the corporate finance department, concentrating on oil and gas. He became head of the department in 1983 and spent a lot of time on mergers and acquisitions.  On February 18, 1986, Stephens was appointed president and CEO of Stephens Inc.

In 1990, he was the senior advisor to Tyson Foods in their acquisition of Holly Farms in a nine-month takeover battle. He is only the third chairman, president and CEO in the firm's more than 80 years of operations since 1933.

In 2006, Stephens acquired 100 percent of the outstanding shares of Stephens Inc from the other family members.

Stephens serves on the board of Dillard's.

Political involvement
A Republican, he supported Bob Dole in 1996, Steve Forbes in 1999, and has supported Mike Huckabee. Stephens was a bundler for Mitt Romney in 2012. He has been critical of Presidents Bill Clinton and Barack Obama. During the 2016 election, Stephens and his brother Jackson Stephens were major financial supporters of the Stop Trump movement.

Philanthropy
Stephens served on the board of trustees of his alma mater, Washington and Lee University.  Stephens and his wife Harriet are benefactors of various organizations, most notably the Episcopal Collegiate School and the Arkansas Arts Center, both in Little Rock.

References

1957 births
Living people
American chief executives of financial services companies
American billionaires
Businesspeople from Little Rock, Arkansas
Washington and Lee University alumni
Wake Forest University alumni
Arkansas Republicans
People named in the Paradise Papers